Santiago Ciganda Forni (born 16 January 1994) is an Uruguayan footballer who plays as a forward for Foligno.

Career
Ciganda began his career in 2015 with River Plate Montevideo, where he played for one season.

After a spell at French club Stade Bordelais in the 2020-21 season, Ciganda moved to Italian Serie D club Nereto FC on 23 September 2021. Less than two months later, on 5 November 2021, Ciganda moved to fellow league club Foligno.

References

External links

1994 births
Living people
Uruguayan footballers
Association football forwards
Club Atlético River Plate (Montevideo) players
Club Nacional de Football players
C.A. Cerro players
Deportivo Maldonado players
Deportivo Coopsol players
Stade Bordelais (football) players
A.S.D. Città di Foligno 1928 players
Uruguayan Primera División players
Uruguayan Segunda División players
Peruvian Segunda División players
Championnat National 3 players
Serie D players
Uruguayan expatriate footballers
Uruguayan expatriate sportspeople in Peru
Uruguayan expatriate sportspeople in France
Uruguayan expatriate sportspeople in Italy
Expatriate footballers in Peru
Expatriate footballers in France
Expatriate footballers in Italy